Highway 431, is a suburban freeway in the south of the Tel Aviv Metropolitan Area in Israel. The freeway connects the Ayalon Highway in the west with Highway 1 in the east. It then continues east into Modi'in as a local road.

The freeway has six lanes (three in each direction) over a total length of 21 km. There is also a short Collector/Distributor system between Rishon Darom and Nes Ziona Interchanges. There are 12 interchanges along its length, 5 of them freeway to freeway interchanges. There are also 54 km of service roads, including exits and entrance ramps.

The design of the freeway includes a right of way for a double track railway in its median between Ein HaKore and Modi'in. Railway sections are currently operational between Be'er Yaakov and HaRishonim Interchange, and between Anava Interchange and Modi'in; construction of the Rishon LeZion–Modi'in railway began in 2019. The freeway and railway also cross three existing railway lines along the route and the design allows for a connection to two of them.

Highway 431 is the first PFI project in Israel. Netivey HaYovel, a subsidiary of Danya Cebus and Africa Israel Investments Ltd., was awarded the 25 year tender to build, maintain and operate the freeway. As of October 16, 2014, the cost of the freeway had been 2.5 billion NIS (approximately 620 million USD). Following the completion of the freeway in February 2016, the company is expecting a 200 million NIS (50 million USD) grant from the state.

History
Construction started in 2005 and the road was fully opened 4 February 2009.

A section of the highway between Mevo Ayalon Interchange and Gan Ha'Vradim Interchange was set to open 23 October 2008, approximately 3 months ahead of schedule. However, on 22 October, it was announced that the opening will be postponed for at least two weeks due to Netivey HaYovel's failure to complete the required environmental mitigation, as was the case of Jerusalem Route 9. The road finally opened 12 November, after Danya Cebus agreed to place several million NIS as a guarantee that the required works will be carried out.

The second section between Gan Ha'Vradim Interchange and Anava Interchange opened on the evening of 4 February 2009. Although the freeway was fully opened at this point, there was some work left around it. At Ein Ha'Kore, the Road 4311 bridge over Highway 42 has not been completed leaving a traffic light at what was planned to be a grade-separated freeway segment, and at Nesharim Interchange the western exits have yet to open. The exits at Nesharim opened 20 May 2009, and the bridge at Ein Ha'Kore opened 29 June 2009. All other works along the freeway were finished by September 2009.

The local road in Modi'in was partially opened together with the freeway, initially with one lane in each direction. Construction on this section was completed in November 2009, providing a limited-access, multiple lane, grade-separated highway all the way from the Ayalon Highway near the Mediterranean coast to the entrance to Modi'in.

Starting in May 2010, electronic signs for a traffic control system were installed along the freeway.

Interchanges

References

External links
 Project information from Danya Cebus
 Project information from D.E.L Engineering

Limited-access roads in Israel
Roads in Israel